Harmony Union School District is a public school district based in Occidental, California which feeds into the West Sonoma County Union High School District.  Its offices are located at 1935 Bohemian Highway, Occidental, CA 95465. As of October 2009, it had an enrollment of 790 students (including charter school students).

Schools

Harmony Elementary School (kindergarten to grade 2)
Pathways Charter School (charter school, kindergarten to grade 12)
Salmon Creek Middle School (charter school, grades Preschool-8)

Board of trustees
The school board consists of:
 Henry Goff, President
 Fawn Nekton, Clerk
 Steven Bair
 Janet Foley
 Charlie Laird

See also
List of school districts in Sonoma County, California

References

External links
 
 Sonoma County district map

School districts in Sonoma County, California